Hugh Edward Kennedy (11 July 1879 – 1 December 1936) was an Irish Cumann na nGaedheal politician, barrister and judge who served as Chief Justice of Ireland from 1924 to 1936, a judge of the Supreme Court from 1924 to 1936 and Attorney General of Ireland from 1922 to 1924. He served as a Teachta Dála (TD) for the Dublin South constituency from 1923 to 1924. As a member of the Irish Free State Constitution Commission, he was also one of the constitutional architects of the Irish Free State.

Early life and education
Kennedy was born in Dublin in 1879. He was the son of the surgeon Hugh Boyle Kennedy and Mary Kate Kennedy (née Kennedy; not related), from County Tipperary. His younger sister was the journalist Mary Olivia Kennedy. He studied for the examinations of the Royal University while a student at University College Dublin and King's Inns, Dublin, and was called to the Bar in 1902. He was appointed King's Counsel in 1920 and became a Bencher of King's Inn in 1922.

He married Clare Murphy (died 1975) in Dublin in 1911. They had no children. She was the daughter of a successful Liverpool Irish timber merchant, John Murphy.

Career
During 1920 and 1921, Kennedy was a senior legal adviser to the representatives of Dáil Éireann during the negotiations for the Anglo-Irish Treaty. He was highly regarded as a lawyer by Michael Collins, who later regretted that Kennedy had not been part of the delegation sent to London in 1921, to negotiate the terms of the treaty.

Attorney General of Ireland

On 31 January 1922, Kennedy became the first Attorney General in the Provisional Government of the Irish Free State. Later that year he was appointed by the Provisional Government to the Irish Free State Constitution Commission to draft the Constitution of the Irish Free State. The Irish Free State was established on 6 December 1922. The functions of the Provisional Government were transferred to the Executive Council of the Irish Free State. Kennedy was appointed Attorney General of the Irish Free State on 7 December 1922.

In 1923, he was appointed to the Judiciary Commission by the Government of the Irish Free State, on a reference from the Government to establish a new system for the administration of justice in accordance with the Constitution of the Irish Free State. The Judiciary Commission was chaired by Lord Glenavy, who had also been the last Lord Chancellor of Ireland. It drafted the Courts of Justice Act 1924 for a new court system, including a High Court and a Supreme Court, and provided for the abolition, inter alia, of the Irish Court of Appeal and the Irish High Court of Justice. Most of the judges were not reappointed to the new courts. Kennedy personally oversaw the selection of the new judges, and made impressive efforts to select them on merit alone. The results were not always happy: his diary, of which some extracts have been published, reveal the increasingly unhappy atmosphere in the Supreme Court itself, due to frequent clashes between Kennedy and his colleague Judge Gerald Fitzgibbon, since the two men proved to be so different in temperament and political outlook that they found it almost impossible to work together harmoniously. In a similar vein, Kennedy's legal opinion and choice of words could raise eyebrows amongst legal colleagues and fury in the Executive Council, for example regarding the Kenmare incident.

He was also a delegate of the Irish Free State to the Fourth Assembly of the League of Nations, between 3 and 29 September 1923.

Dáil Éireann
He was elected to Dáil Éireann on 27 October 1923, as a Cumann na nGaedheal TD at a by-election in the Dublin South constituency. He was the first person to be elected in a by-election to Dáil Éireann. He resigned his seat in June 1924 when he was appointed Chief Justice of Ireland.

Chief Justice of Ireland
On 5 June 1924, he was appointed Chief Justice of Ireland, thereby becoming the first Chief Justice of the Irish Free State. He is also the youngest person appointed Chief Justice of Ireland. When he was appointed he was 44 years old. Although the High Court of Justice and the Court of Appeal had been abolished and replaced by the High Court and the Supreme Court respectively. Kennedy campaigned for the replacement of the wigs and gowns traditionally worn by judges and barristers, which he regarded as the trappings of an alien regime. He received little support from the judges or the government and the traditional dress was retained. He held the position of Chief Justice, until his death on 1 December 1936.

In September 2015, a biography by Patrick Kennedy (no relation) was written on him called Hugh Kennedy: The Great But Neglected Chief Justice.

References

External links
Article at University College Dublin archives department
AttorneyGeneral.ie

1879 births
1936 deaths
Alumni of the Royal University of Ireland
Attorneys General of Ireland
Chief justices of Ireland
Cumann na nGaedheal TDs
Irish Queen's Counsel
Members of the 4th Dáil
People associated with University College Dublin
Politicians from County Dublin
20th-century King's Counsel
Alumni of King's Inns